Archaeodelphis is an extinct genus of primitive odontocete cetacean from late Oligocene (Chattian) marine deposits in South Carolina, and belonging to the family Xenorophidae.

Description
Archaeodelphis has polydont teeth, like other xenorophids.

References

Oligocene cetaceans
Fossil taxa described in 1921